Eosomichelinoceras is an extinct genus from the actively mobile carnivorous cephalopod family Baltoceratidae that lived in what would be Asia and South America during the Ordovician from 461—452 mya, existing for approximately .

Taxonomy 
Eosomichelinoceras was named by Chen (1974) Its type is Eosomichelinoceras huananense. It was assigned to Orthocerida by Chen (1974); and to Baltoceratidae by Kröger et al. (2007).

Morphology 
Eosomichelinoceras is a smooth or transversally lirate slender, orthoconic baltoceratid with a narrow, tubular siphuncle, located between the center and the edge of the shell. Connecting rings are thin, septal necks orthochoanitic, and without known endosiphuncular or cameral deposits.

Distribution 
Fossils of Eosomichelinoceras have been found in Argentina, China and Iran.

References

Further reading 
 Fossils (Smithsonian Handbooks) by David Ward

Prehistoric cephalopod genera
Ordovician cephalopods
Molluscs of Asia
Ordovician animals of Asia
Cephalopods of South America
Ordovician animals of South America
Ordovician Argentina
Fossil taxa described in 1974
Orthocerida